Lauritz Nelson (March 26, 1860 – September 16, 1944) was a sailor serving in the United States Navy during the Spanish–American War who received the Medal of Honor for bravery.

Biography
Nelson was born March 26, 1860, in Norway and entered the US navy in 1885. Later he was sent to fight in the Spanish–American War aboard the torpedo boat  as a sailmaker's mate.

Lauritz retired from the navy in 1905 with the rank of Chief Boatswain's Mate. He died September 16, 1944, and is buried at Long Island National Cemetery in Farmingdale, New York.

Medal of Honor citation
Rank and organization: Sailmaker's Mate, U.S. Navy. Born: 26 March 1860, Norway. G.O. No.: 521, 7 July 1899.

Citation:

On board the U.S.S. Nashville during the operation of cutting the cable leading from Cienfuegos, Cuba, 11 May 1898. Facing the heavy fire of the enemy, Nelson displayed extraordinary bravery and coolness throughout this action.

See also

List of Medal of Honor recipients for the Spanish–American War

References

External links

1860 births
1944 deaths
United States Navy Medal of Honor recipients
United States Navy sailors
American military personnel of the Spanish–American War
Norwegian emigrants to the United States
Norwegian-born Medal of Honor recipients
Spanish–American War recipients of the Medal of Honor